The 2008 Clipsal 500 Adelaide was Round 1 of the 2008 V8 Supercar Championship Series. It was held from 21 to 24 February around the inner city streets of Adelaide, the capital of South Australia. The Adelaide 500 is a unique event where the round results are determined by the results from the second race, rather that the driver with the most points from the weekend. This means that the winner of the round does not necessarily lead the championship after the event.

Qualifying 
Qualify was held on Friday 22 February. Jamie Whincup broke the qualifying lap record to snare pole position. James Courtney put himself on the front row in second position with Mark Winterbottom completing a Ford top three. Defending champion Garth Tander fulfilled on early promise at his new team to be best Holden in fourth position.

Race 1 
Race 1 was held on Saturday 23 February.

Jamie Whincup was slow away, allowing Garth Tander and James Courtney to force the pace early with Courtney breaking away to a five-second lead. Courtney's lead was squandered after a clash in the Senna Chicane while lapping Jason Richards saw a tyre cut and shredded. Tander later disappeared downfield with suspension damage. Mark Winterbottom led towards the end of the race until a late race safety car period, caused by a clash between HSV Dealer Team teammates Rick Kelly and Paul Dumbrell bunched the field up allowing Whincup, who had earlier had a voltage problem leading to a battery change after 12 laps, to charge through the field, passing Winterbottom with two laps to go to win. Teammate Craig Lowndes, hampered by a jammed anti-roll bar, finished third behind Winterbottom, with Lee Holdsworth the first Holden home in fourth place.

It was an excellent result for the three of the four senior Ford teams, Team Vodafone putting both cars on the podium, Ford Performance Racing were second and fifth, with sixth and seventh filled by Jim Beam Racing.

Courtney, who finished in tenth position, was overnight relegated by the stewards to 16th position because of the clash with Jason Richards, and another similar clash with the other Tasman Motorsport Commodore of Greg Murphy, which also cost him 31 series points.

Race 2 
Race 2 was held on Sunday 24 February.
Mark Winterbottom lead the race early on with Jamie Whincup moving into the lead before the compulsory pit stops began. Whincup resumed in the lead for much of the remainder of the race, but the minor placings became controversial after a number of overtaking incidents and clashes while overtaking punctuated the race, ending with a collision between James Courtney and Craig Lowndes on lap 55 as Lowndes was overtaking Courtney, the incident also eliminating Winterbottom. After the restart Steven Johnson was controversially assigned a driver-through penalty after overtaking Fabian Coulthard before the restart of the race, although Coulthard's car was slowing and retired to the pits the same lap. Garth Tander also was removed in an overtaking incident, after contact with Johnson sent the Ford driver wide and off track, Tander was glanced by Courtney after losing momentum leaving himself vulnerable to a pass from the following car. The glancing blow triggered a second suspension failure for the defending champion.

With several top runners removed Cameron McConville moved into second for many laps before losing the place with only a few laps to go to Lee Holdsworth. The two Holden racers completed the podium with Todd Kelly making three Holdens in the top four. Fifth place was a career best result for New Zealand teenager Shane van Gisbergen who had only entering V8 Supercar late last year.

Results
Results as follows:

Qualifying

Race 1 results

Race 2 results

Notes
Ulladulla driver Ashley Cooper was involved in a high-speed accident on Saturday morning, after lap 11 in the second race of the Fujitsu series, the lead support category at the Adelaide 500, which utilises older V8 Supercars retired from the main series teams. The accident occurred at the notorious Turn 8 after Cooper clipped the barrier inside of the corners apex unsettling the car for the right hand bend and the car hit the wall on the outside of the corner broadside on. Cooper died on 25 February due to injuries sustained in the crash.

Post race
Two incidents in the two races brought the attention of driving standards for the next round at Eastern Creek, the first was Jamie Whincup. During the first race he made contact with Mark Winterbottom with two laps to go. This gave Whincup the win and although race control looked at the incident, they decided that no action should be taken.

The second incident involved Craig Lowndes and James Courtney. On lap 56 Courtney was in second and Lowndes third. Coming into the hairpin (turn 9) Lowndes went straight down the inside of Courtney and going into turn 11 Courtney turned Lowndes around sending both into the wall. Mark Winterbottom was also caught up within the accident and all three were DNF'ed. The new Driving Standards Observer Tomas Mezera received plenty of criticism, because Lowndes already had done a similar move to Winterbottom and Lee Holdsworth a few laps before.

Standings
After Round 1 of 14

References

External links
Clipsal 500 website
Official timing and results

Adelaide 500
Clipsal
2000s in Adelaide